FC Niutao is a Tuvalu football club from Niutao, playing in the Tuvalu A-Division.

The team's home ground is the Tuvalu Sports Ground, the only football field in Tuvalu. Niutao plays on an amateur level, as do all the teams in Tuvalu. They also have a reserve squad.

History
Niutao have won the first three years that the Tuvalu A-Division existed. In 2001, 2002 and in 2003.

Current squad
As of 5 July 2012.

Niutao B
As of 16 August 2012.

Honours

League
Tuvalu A-Division
Winners (3): 2001, 2002, 2003

Cup
Independence Cup
Runners-up (2): 1999, 2000

External links
 vriendenvantuvalu.nl
 tnfa.tv

Niutao
Football clubs in Tuvalu
Association football clubs established in 1980
1980 establishments in Tuvalu